Chah Mahi (also Romanized as Chāh Māhī, Chāh-e Ma‘ī, Chāh-e Mo‘ī, and Chāh Mo‘ī) is a village in Rostaq Rural District, Rostaq District, Darab County, Fars Province, Iran. As of the 2006 census, its population was 105, in 23 families.

References 

Populated places in Darab County